The Campaign to Suppress Bandits in Northern China was a counterinsurgency campaign that the Chinese communists fought against. The nationalist guerrilla movement, that mostly consisted of bandits and nationalist regular troops, was left behind after the nationalist government withdrew from mainland China. The campaign was fought during the Chinese Civil War in the post-World War II era and resulted in communist victory.

Campaign
Before the nationalist government withdrew from North China, it ordered troops left behind to join local bandits to wage a guerrilla war against the communists. To further boost the fighting capabilities of bandits, many military professionals were sent to the bandits, so that their military operations could be strengthened. The size of each group of bandits varied greatly, from the smallest of a dozen to the largest consisting of several thousands. Usually, there were several hundred bandits in a group. In March 1949, the bandit activity reached its peak, for a total of 103 attacks.

The future field marshal of the Chinese communist force, Nie Rongzhen was in charge of eradicating bandits in northern China. In April 1949, orders were given to suppress local bandits, putting an emphasis on not underestimating them.  A month later, a conference on bandit suppression was held, setting the strategies that included adopting political pressure against bandits, and mobilizing the general populace to eliminate the social bases of bandits.  In June 1949, further strategies were devised, concentrating on using small striking forces in quick assaults, instead of ineffective large formations that were easily discovered and slow-moving.

The nationalist force had left behind deserters many of which could become bandits if left unattended. Knowing this, Nie Rongzhen ordered communist forces to immediately accept the surrender of deserters of nationalist forces and providing for them so that their livelihoods would be stabilized, thus preventing them from joining the bandits. By June 1949, over thirty-seven thousand former nationalist troops left behind had surrendered, and the communists eliminated a huge potential threat.  After a year of fighting, the campaign was finally concluded with a communist victory with the annihilation of over twenty-nine thousand bandits.  The communist victory ensured that Beijing, the new capital of the People's Republic of China became relatively safe in the infancy of the new nation.

Outcome
Although sharing the common anti-communist goal, the nationalist guerrilla and insurgency warfare was largely handicapped by the enlistment of bandits, many of whom had fought and killed nationalist troops earlier in the eradication / pacification campaign, and also looted, kidnapped and even killed landlords and business owners, an important faction that supported the nationalist government, but now must united against the common enemy, which is half-hearted at the best. Compounding the problem further with additional differences within the ranks of the nationalist guerilla's themselves, the futile nationalist guerrilla and insurgency warfare against its communist enemy was destined to fail.

See also
List of battles of the Chinese Civil War
National Revolutionary Army
History of the People's Liberation Army
Chinese Civil War

References

Zhu, Zongzhen and Wang, Chaoguang, Liberation War History, 1st Edition, Social Scientific Literary Publishing House in Beijing, 2000,  (set)
Zhang, Ping, History of the Liberation War, 1st Edition, Chinese Youth Publishing House in Beijing, 1987,  (pbk.)
Jie, Lifu, Records of the Liberation War: The Decisive Battle of Two Kinds of Fates, 1st Edition, Hebei People's Publishing House in Shijiazhuang, 1990,  (set)
Literary and Historical Research Committee of the Anhui Committee of the Chinese People's Political Consultative Conference, Liberation War, 1st Edition, Anhui People's Publishing House in Hefei, 1987, 
Li, Zuomin, Heroic Division and Iron Horse: Records of the Liberation War, 1st Edition, Chinese Communist Party History Publishing House in Beijing, 2004, 
Wang, Xingsheng, and Zhang, Jingshan, Chinese Liberation War, 1st Edition, People's Liberation Army Literature and Art Publishing House in Beijing, 2001,  (set)
Huang, Youlan, History of the Chinese People's Liberation War, 1st Edition, Archives Publishing House in Beijing, 1992, 
Liu Wusheng, From Yan'an to Beijing: A Collection of Military Records and Research Publications of Important Campaigns in the Liberation War, 1st Edition, Central Literary Publishing House in Beijing, 1993, 
Tang, Yilu and Bi, Jianzhong, History of Chinese People's Liberation Army in Chinese Liberation War, 1st Edition, Military Scientific Publishing House in Beijing, 1993–1997,  (Volum 1), 7800219615 (Volum 2), 7800219631 (Volum 3), 7801370937 (Volum 4), and 7801370953 (Volum 5)

Battles of the Chinese Civil War
1949 in China
1950 in China
Campaigns to Suppress Bandits